Steppin' Out is an album by Tony Bennett that was released in 1993. A tribute to Fred Astaire, the album continued Bennett's commercial comeback; like the previous year's Perfectly Frank, it achieved gold record status in the United States. In 1994, it won the Grammy Award for Best Traditional Pop Vocal Performance. A music video for "Steppin' Out with My Baby" received airplay on MTV.

Track listing
 "Steppin' Out with My Baby" (Irving Berlin) – 2:53
 "Who Cares?" (George Gershwin, Ira Gershwin) – 3:17
 "Top Hat, White Tie and Tails" (Berlin) – 2:38
 "They Can't Take That Away from Me" (G. Gershwin, I. Gershwin) – 3:36
 "Dancing in the Dark" (Howard Dietz, Arthur Schwartz) – 3:23
 "A Shine on Your Shoes" (Dietz, Schwartz) – 2:22
 "He Loves and She Loves" (G. Gershwin, I. Gershwin) – 3:30
 "They All Laughed" (G. Gershwin, I. Gershwin) – 2:14
 "I Concentrate on You" (Cole Porter) – 3:03
 "You're All The World to Me" (Burton Lane, Alan Jay Lerner) – 3:08
 "All of You" (Porter) – 3:35
 "Nice Work If You Can Get It" (G. Gershwin, I. Gershwin) – 3:51
 "It Only Happens When I Dance With You" (Berlin) – 2:11
 "Shall We Dance?" (G. Gershwin, I. Gershwin) – 1:33
 "You're Easy to Dance With"/"Change Partners"/"Cheek to Cheek" (Berlin) – 4:38
 "I Guess I'll Have to Change My Plan" (Dietz, Schwartz) – 2:46
 "That's Entertainment!" (Dietz, Schwartz) – 2:01
 "By Myself" (Dietz, Schwartz) – 2:09

Personnel
 Tony Bennett – vocals
 Ralph Sharon – piano
 Doug Richeson – double bass
 Clayton Cameron – drums

References

1993 albums
Tony Bennett albums
Fred Astaire tribute albums
Columbia Records albums
Albums produced by David Kahne
Grammy Award for Best Traditional Pop Vocal Album